Corcentric, LLC, formerly AmeriQuest, Inc. is a financial process automation, procurement, and asset management services company.  The company is headquartered in Cherry Hill, New Jersey. Its subsidiary companies include AmeriQuest Transportation Services, Corcentric, NationaLease, and CURE Leasing and Maintenance. The company employs 250 people in seven offices in the Continental United States.

Background

AMTRALEASE
AMTRALEASE was an American truck leasing and rental association. The company was formed in 1978 as an alternative for independent, full-service truck leasing firms who were unable to gain membership into NationaLease due to territorial restrictions. The association became a trademarked organization in 1979 under the incorporated entity American Truck Leasing Network. AMTRALEASE was the formalized name that American Truck Leasing Network adopted. Charter members included the founder of AMTRALEASE which was United Truck Leasing Corp., Kris-Way, Public Service, Decarolis, Leroy Holding Company, and sixteen other truck leasing firms.

It was made up of members that provided reciprocal road service to leased vehicles and equipment within a certain geographic area of the affiliates. Also fuel, and substitute vehicles if needed. Co-operative purchasing of trucks and tractors was provided for the benefit of the membership. Robert Abrams, President and CEO of United Truck Leasing Corporation at that time, was elected as the consortium's first president. In 1997, Bill Brown was named chairman of the association. The organization held annual conventions and quarterly meetings with speakers.

In 2001, the association was strategic partners with private entities such as AmeriQuest to develop additional services. After a vote of its members, the organization was acquired by AmeriQuest in 2003. AmeriQuest merged with Nationalease in December, 2006 and adopted that organization's name moving forward.

AmeriQuest
AmeriQuest was founded in 1996 by entrepreneur Douglas Clark. In 2002, the company acquired Corcentric, a cloud-based financial process automation company. In 2006, the leasing entity of AmeriQuest merged with the leasing entity of NationaLease Purchasing Corporation.

AmeriQuest has been recognized by Inc. in the Inc. 5000 list as one of America's fastest-growing private companies for nine years, most recently in 2015.  The New Jersey Business Journal included AmeriQuest on its list of the 50 Fastest Growing Companies in New Jersey in 2009, 2010, 2011, 2013, and 2014. The Philadelphia Business Journal recognized AmeriQuest on its list of Fastest Growing Companies, Southern New Jersey, for nine years.

AmeriQuest Business Services is not and never has been affiliated in any way with Ameriquest Mortgage.

References

External links

Business services companies of the United States
Business services companies established in 1996
Cherry Hill, New Jersey
Companies based in Camden County, New Jersey